Hopewell is an unincorporated community in Madison County, Florida, United States.

References

Unincorporated communities in Madison County, Florida
Unincorporated communities in Florida